Oberon is a character appearing in comic books published by DC Comics, created by Jack Kirby. He is the diminutive manager of Mister Miracle, and named after the legendary fairy king Oberon.

Fictional character biography
According to Secret Origins #33, Oberon was orphaned at a young age in a fire. He seeks work with a traveling circus and is made to perform menial labor under a verbally and physically abusive ringmaster. Oberon is eventually rescued by escape artist, Thaddeus Brown, the original Mister Miracle. He becomes Brown's assistant and protégé, helping him plan his elaborate escapes.

Oberon later accompanies Brown to Vietnam to seek Brown's missing son. There, they become embroiled in the schemes of a criminal called Steel Hand. As a result, upon their return to America, Brown is killed and his mysterious friend Scott Free (a member of the New Gods) becomes the new Mister Miracle, finally rescuing Brown's son and  bringing the killer to justice. As he had with Brown, Oberon agrees to become Scott's partner and manager and plans his escape artistry performances.

Oberon shares a somewhat antagonistic relationship with Scott's wife, Big Barda. The two frequently tease and insult each other — Oberon declaring that Barda is all legs and no brain, Barda mocking Oberon's diminutive stature. In truth, the two are indeed friends, but little they are willing to admit it.

When Mister Miracle becomes a member of the Justice League International, Oberon assumes the position of the right-hand man of Maxwell Lord. He is also briefly the boyfriend of Fire. An example is seen in Justice League Quarterly #4 where he has a double date, accompanying the two are Guy Gardner and Ice. The latter is taken over a by a demon. Shiloh Norman, Scott Free's successor, encounters Oberon's alleged daughter, who claims Oberon abandoned her mother back during his carnival days. Since their departure from that group, Oberon has resumed his role as Scott Free's manager. He, Barda and Scott are later attendees of Green Arrow and Black Canary's wedding.

Oberon's friendships are shaken up when Maxwell Lord, desiring to control all super-beings, murders Blue Beetle, who opposes him. Oberon attends the funeral with the majority of his League friends in the Booster Gold series.

The majority of the New Gods are slain during an incident where the cosmic 'Source' wishes to reunite with its other half, the Anti-Life Equation. Mister Miracle and Barda are two of the fatalities. However, they are seen alive at the end of the Final Crisis incident.

Since the death of Scott Free, Oberon has been active with the Meta-Movers, a professional wrecking crew. They come into conflict with the Doom Patrol on 'Oolong Island'. Said island is an independent enclave of morally questionable scientists.

Mister Miracle later returns and re-establishes a suburban life with Barda. Scott soon begins seeing things he does not believe are real. He is told by Barda that his social visit with Oberon is not real as Oberon had passed due to throat cancer.

Alternate versions
A chronologically older Oberon is experiencing much distress in his personal life. He proposes to Fire, now a successful business executive and she gladly accepts.

An alternate version of Oberon and the 'Super Buddies' team are shown in the Justice League 3000 team. In this reality, Beatriz trades places with Tora in hell, becoming lost to the team. Ice willingly leaves the team.

In other media

Television
 Oberon appears in the Justice League Unlimited episode "The Ties That Bind", voiced by Dick Miller. Granny Goodness kidnaps Oberon to blackmail Mister Miracle into rescuing Kalibak from Virman Vunderbarr in return for his safety.
 Oberon appears in the teaser of the Batman: The Brave and the Bold episode "Last Bat on Earth!", voiced by Dee Bradley Baker. He is shown during Batman and Mister Miracle's charity stunt show.

See also
 Oberon

References

Comics characters introduced in 1971
Characters created by Jack Kirby
Fourth World (comics)